Megalagrion jugorum (common name Maui Upland Damselfly) is a possibly extinct species of damselfly in the family Coenagrionidae that is endemic to the island of Maui in Hawaii.

References

Coenagrionidae
Insects described in 1899
Extinct insects since 1500
Extinct Hawaiian animals
Taxonomy articles created by Polbot